USCGC Bluebell (WLI-313) is a United States Coast Guard inland buoy tender based out of Portland, Oregon.

History 
Bluebell was commissioned on April 4, 1945. From 1945 to 1973 Bluebell was stationed in Vancouver, Washington. Bluebell was moved to Swan Island in Portland, Oregon, in 1973, where she has remained since. Bluebell is classified as an inland buoy tender and is one of two 100-foot inland buoy tenders in service. The other, is the Coast Guard Cutter Buckthorn (WLI-642) homeported in Sault Ste. Marie, MI.

Bluebell is the second oldest cutter in the Coast Guard fleet, and the oldest west of the Mississippi River. The ship is home to a crew of 15 led by a chief warrant officer, with a chief petty officer as the second in command.

Mission 
As a buoy tender, the crew's primary mission is to ensure the safety of mariners by establishing and maintaining essential navigation aids along established waterways. The crew is responsible for maintaining more than 420 aids to navigation (ATONs) along 500 miles across the Columbia, Willamette and Snake Rivers. Altogether, Bluebell’s crew is responsible for 23 percent of the ATONs in the Pacific Northwest.

References 

Ships of the United States Coast Guard
1945 ships
Ships built in Tacoma, Washington